Evan Patrick Marshall (born April 18, 1990) is an American professional baseball pitcher in the Los Angeles Angels organization. He has played in Major League Baseball (MLB) for the Arizona Diamondbacks, Seattle Mariners, Cleveland Indians and Chicago White Sox.

Career

Arizona Diamondbacks
Marshall graduated from Homestead High School in Cupertino, California in 2008.  Marshall was drafted by the Arizona Diamondbacks in the fourth round of the 2011 Major League Baseball Draft out of Kansas State University. He was called up to the majors for the first time on May 5, 2014.  While pitching for the minor league Reno Aces on August 7, 2015, he was hit in the head by a batted ball.  He had a skull fracture and needed neurosurgical treatment to relieve the raised intra-cranial pressure.

Seattle Mariners
Marshall was claimed off waivers by the Seattle Mariners on April 4, 2017. He elected free agency on November 6, 2017.

Cleveland Indians
On November 30, 2017, Marshall signed a minor league deal with the Cleveland Indians. He had his contract purchased on May 3, 2018. The Indians designated Marshall for assignment on September 1, 2018. After clearing waivers, Marshall was outrighted to the minor leagues on September 4, 2018. He elected free agency on October 2, 2018.

Chicago White Sox
On October 31, 2018, Marshall signed a minor league deal with the Chicago White Sox. He was assigned to Triple-A to start the 2019 season. On May 1, 2019, the White Sox purchased his contract and he pitched in a game against the Baltimore Orioles that day, pitching  innings and retiring all 4 batters he faced. In his first season in Chicago, Marshall registered an ERA of 2.49 in 55 games. In the 2020 season, Marshall appeared in 23 games, compiling a 2–1 record with 2.38 ERA and 30 strikeouts in  innings pitched. 

Marshall pitched 27.1 innings across 27 games for the White Sox in 2021, accumulating a 5.60 ERA, 4.63 FIP, and an 8.6 K/9 rate. The righty suffered a strained right flexor pronator in his elbow, which forced him to the 10-day injured list on June 29. The club then placed Marshall on the 60-day injured list on July 29. On November 5, 2021, Marshall was outrighted off of the 40-man roster and elected free agency.

On November 23, 2021, Marshall elected to undergo Tommy John surgery and missed the entire 2022 season.

Los Angeles Angels
On March 17, 2023, Marshall signed a minor league contract with the Los Angeles Angels organization.

References

External links

Kansas State Wildcats bio

1990 births
Living people
Sportspeople from Sunnyvale, California
Baseball players from California
Major League Baseball pitchers
Arizona Diamondbacks players
Seattle Mariners players
Cleveland Indians players
Chicago White Sox players
Kansas State Wildcats baseball players
Yakima Bears players
Visalia Rawhide players
Mobile BayBears players
Salt River Rafters players
Reno Aces players
Tacoma Rainiers players
Arizona League Mariners players
Arkansas Travelers players
Venados de Mazatlán players
American expatriate baseball players in Mexico
Columbus Clippers players
Charlotte Knights players